Joyce Ann Messenger  (August 7, 1931 – September 14, 2015) was an infielder who played in the All-American Girls Professional Baseball League.

According to All-American League data, Messinger played for the Grand Rapids Chicks club during its 1953 season. Additional information is incomplete because there are no records available at the time of the request.

In 1988 was inaugurated a permanent display at the Baseball Hall of Fame and Museum at Cooperstown, New York, that honors those who were part of the All-American Girls Professional Baseball League. Joyce Messinger, along with the rest of the girls and the league staff, is included at the display/exhibit.

Sources

All-American Girls Professional Baseball League players
Baseball players from Michigan
Sportspeople from Lansing, Michigan
2015 deaths
1931 births
21st-century American women